Li River is a river in Thailand with a length of . It runs through Li District and Thung Hua Chang in Lamphun Province, Thailand. It is a tributary of the Ping River. It merges into the Ping River on the left at Chom Thong District in Chiang Mai Province.

References 

Rivers of Thailand